Adam Fletcher Randell (born 1 October 2000) is an English professional footballer who plays as a midfielder for  side Plymouth Argyle.

Career
Randell signed his first professional contract on 1 November 2018 after progressing through the Plymouth Argyle Academy.

Randell made his professional debut on 13 November 2018 in an EFL Trophy match between Argyle and EFL League Two side Newport County, where he started in midfield. Newport won the game 2–0.

In the first friendly of the 2019–20 season, Randell was given the captain's armband by manager Ryan Lowe. With his performance in pre-season Randell was a regular on the bench in the 19/20 season and was the first back up for the defensive midfield position.

Randell joined Torquay United in October 2020 and made his debut as an 80th-minute substitute against Stockport on 3 October in the National League at Plainmoor. He also appeared in the FA Trophy and FA Cup for Torquay. Randell has spent most of his playing time in his main role as a defensive midfielder however, he has been used as a right back as cover for injuries when needed showing his versatility on the field.

Randell won Torquay United's Young Player of the Season award for the 2020–21 season.

Due to Randell's impressive performances on loan at Torquay, Lowe and Plymouth Argyle offered Randell a new contract keeping him at Home Park until the end of the 2021-22 season.

Randell made his full league debut on 30 November 2021 in a 2-1 win against Ipswich Town playing the full match.

Career statistics

References

Living people
2000 births
Footballers from Plymouth, Devon
English footballers
Plymouth Argyle F.C. players
Torquay United F.C. players
Association football midfielders
English Football League players
National League (English football) players